The World Association of Kickboxing Organizations (W.A.K.O or WAKO) is an international kickboxing organization counting over 120 affiliated countries representing all five continents. WAKO is a major governing body of amateur kickboxing and is responsible for the development of kickboxing worldwide. The organization was officially recognized as an official kickboxing governing body by Sport Accord. WAKO is recognized by the Global Association of International Sports Federations (GAISF) and the International Olympic Committee (IOC).

History
In 1977, WAKO was founded in Europe and formulated the rules and regulations acting as the Kickboxing Federation of the World. It was founded by American Kickboxing promoter Mike Anderson, and his friend, German Kickboxing promoter Georg Brueckner. WAKO was officially registered in Zurich, Switzerland and become the largest unified kickboxing organization in the world.
In 2006, the ''International Amateur Kickboxing Sports Association'' (I.A.K.S.A) and WAKO merged under the umbrella of WAKO, making its acceptance possible by the General Association of International Sports Federations (G.A.I.S.F) as the governing body for the sport of Kickboxing. WAKO offers 7 different styles: Points Fighting, light-contact, full-contact, kick-light, low-kick, K1-style, and musical forms. Today WAKO can count on 126 affiliated nations in the five continents, with 95 officially recognized by their respective Sports or Olympic Council.

WAKO became a member of Sport Accord and was officially recognized as the official Kickboxing governing body by Sport Accord, Olympic Council of Asia, WADA and the International World Games Association. Kickboxing is included in World Combat Games, Asian Indoor Games, and the Martial Arts Games (promoted by OCA) in the 2017 International World Games. WAKO has five continental divisions functioning under the auspices of the WAKO International Federation which are WAKO Europe, WAKO Pan America, WAKO Asia, WAKO Oceania and WAKO Africa. WAKO hosts its ordinary General Assemblies in Antalya, Turkey.

In 1991, WAKO PRO was officially established during a WAKO Board meeting in Spain. After a their career as amateurs in the organization, fighters were now able to continue as professional fighters in WAKO Pro.

Olympic recognition 
On the 20th of July 2021, the International Olympic Committee officially recognised kickboxing as an Olympic sport, and recognised WAKO as the world governing body for the sport.

Styles
WAKO supports 7 different styles: four of them are on the tatami and three of them are in the ring,

Tatami Sports

Musical form
A musical form is a staged or imaginary fight against one or more opponents in which the performer uses techniques from Oriental Martial Arts to personally selected music.

Point Fighting
Also known as semi-contact. Point fighting is a discipline where two contestants fight with the primary goal of scoring defined points and using controlled legal techniques without using full force.

 Opponents are allowed to hit each other with punches and kicks. striking above the waist.
 Foot sweeps are allowed.
 Elbows and knees are forbidden.
 Clinch fighting and throws are forbidden.

Light Contact
Light Contact in the past was recognised as an intermediate stage between semi contact and full contact Kickboxing. Modern Light Contact has evolved into its own unique style fast and dynamic continuous kickboxing. Unlike Point Fighting, athletes will fight continuously amassing scores over 3x2 minute rounds.

 Opponents are allowed to hit each other with punches and kicks. striking above the waist and below ankle/mid-calf.
 Foot sweeps are allowed.
 Elbows and knees are forbidden.
 Clinch fighting and throws are forbidden.

Kick-light
Kick-light is an intermediate stage between semi-kick and low-kick kickboxing.

 Opponents are allowed to hit each other with punches and kicks, striking the thigh (only from outside to inside and vice versa), which can be attacked using the shin.
 Foot sweeps are allowed.
 Elbows and knees are forbidden.
 Clinch fighting and throws forbidden.

Ring sports

Full contact
Full Contact is a discipline of Kickboxing where the intention is to mimic the pressure felt during a real fight.

 Opponents are allowed to hit each other with punches and kicks, striking above the waist and below the ankle/mid-calf.
 Foot sweeps are allowed.
 Elbows and knees are forbidden.
 Clinch fighting and throws are forbidden.

Low-kick
In low-kick Kickboxing, there is the possibility of attacking the opponent's legs with clean kicks.

 Opponents are allowed to hit each other with punches and kicks, striking the thigh (only from outside to inside and vice versa) which can be attacked using the shin.
 Foot sweeps are allowed.
 Elbows and knees are forbidden.
 Clinch fighting and throws forbidden.

K1-style
See K-1.

 Opponents are allowed to hit each other with punches,knee and kicks. Legs and any other part of the body can be attacked using the shin.
 Foot sweeps are forbidden
 Elbows are forbidden.
 Throws are forbidden.
 Clinching must be less than 5 seconds. Kickboxers are allowed to hold the opponent's neck with both hands in order to attack only with the knee. You are only allowed one knee strike per clinch exchange.

Competitions 
WAKO holds a world championship every two years, with youth (18 and under) and adult (18–45) championships in separate years; only national teams are accepted. Each member country can present only one competitor in each weight class. Competitors are commonly the national champion of their weight class in that particular Kickboxing style and many are also officially recognized by their National Olympic Committees or Ministry of Sports.

WAKO Kickboxing was one of thirteen combat sports participating in the first Combat Games being held in Beijing, China under the patronage of the IOC and SportAccord. WAKO participated in the World Combat Games in St. Petersburg, Russia in September 2013, under the patronage of the IOC and SportAccord. There were three styles at the Combat Games: Low Kick, Points Fighting (formally called Semi Contact), and Full Contact.

World champions

Men's divisions

As of February 23, 2023

Women's divisions

Sponsors
The World Association of Kickboxing Organizations on Monza, February 6, 2020, signed contracts with two sponsors for the next four years concerning its protecting equipment and clothing. The winning proposal came from Top Ten and Adidas Kickboxing, two worldwide prestige brands within the sports market.

Notable WAKO Pro world champions

 Sergej Maslobojev
 Cédric Doumbé
 Yohan Lidon
 Chingiz Allazov
 Freddy Kemayo
 Vladimir Mineev
 Redouan Cairo
 Grégory Tony 
 Alexei Papin
 Batu Khasikov
 Jorge Loren  
 Mike Bernardo
 Musashi
 Dmitry Shakuta 
 Alessandro Riguccini
 Marek Piotrowski 
 Antonio Plazibat 
 Dževad Poturak 
 Anissa Meksen 
 Petr Vondráček

See also

 List of WAKO Amateur World Championships
 List of WAKO Amateur European Championships
 Wako-Pro World Grand Prix
 List of male kickboxers
 World Kickboxing Association

References

External links
 World Association of Kickboxing Organizations (W.A.K.O International)
 World Association of Kickboxing Organisations (W.A.K.O Pro)
  WAKO IF News

World Association of Kickboxing Organizations
Kickboxing organizations